United may refer to:

Places
 United, Pennsylvania, an unincorporated community
 United, West Virginia, an unincorporated community

Arts and entertainment

Films
 United (2003 film), a Norwegian film
 United (2011 film), a BBC Two film

Literature
 United! (novel), a 1973 children's novel by Michael Hardcastle

Music
 United (band), Japanese thrash metal band formed in 1981

Albums
 United (Commodores album), 1986
 United (Dream Evil album), 2006
 United (Marvin Gaye and Tammi Terrell album), 1967
 United (Marian Gold album), 1996
 United (Phoenix album), 2000
 United (Woody Shaw album), 1981

Songs
 "United" (Judas Priest song), 1980
 "United" (Prince Ital Joe and Marky Mark song), 1994
 "United" (Robbie Williams song), 2000
 "United", a song by Danish duo Nik & Jay featuring Lisa Rowe

Television
 United (TV series), a 1990 BBC Two documentary series
 United!, a soap opera that aired on BBC One from 1965-1967
 "United" (Star Trek: Enterprise), a fourth season television episode

Businesses
 United Airlines, a major American airline
 United Airways, a Bangladeshi airline
 United Automobile Services, a bus operator in England, now merged with the Arriva Group
 United Bank (Atlanta metropolitan area), Georgia, United States
 United Bank (Pakistan)
 United Bank (West Virginia), United States
 United Bus, a bus manufacturing group
 United Technologies Corporation, an American multi-national
 United Telecommunications (disambiguation)
 London United Busways, a bus operating company in London
 London United Tramways, the former operator in London responsible for trams and trolleybuses from 1894 till 1933

Sports

Association football
 Adelaide United FC, an Australian football club
 Carlisle United, an English football club
 Chesterfield United, an English football club
 Colchester United, an English football club
 D.C. United, an American football club
 F.C. United of Manchester, an English football club
 Hartlepool United, an English football club
 Hereford United, an English football club
 Hyde United, an English football club
 Leeds United, an English football club
 Manchester United, an English football club
 Newcastle United, an English football club
 Oxford United, an English football club
 Peterborough United, an English football club
 Rotherham United, an English football club
 Scunthorpe United, an English football club
 Sheffield United, an English football club
 Southend United, an English football club
 Torquay United, an English football club
 Western United FC, an Australian football club
 West Ham United, an English football club

Other sports
 United Rugby Club, a Canadian rugby union club founded in 2005

Other uses
 United (Canarian electoral alliance), a Canary Island-based electoral alliance

See also
 UnitedHealth Group, an American health care company
 Unite (disambiguation)
 Unity (disambiguation)